Aaron Sexton (born 24 August 2000) is an Irish rugby union player who plays wing or fullback for Ulster in the United Rugby Championship

Sexton is also a track sprinter, winning the 2018 and 2019 All-Ireland Schools Championships in both the 100m and 200m, representing Bangor Grammar School. In 2019 Sexton also broke the all-Ireland schools record in both events with times of 10.43 for the 100m and 20.69 for the 200m.

He played for Ulster "A" in the 2018–19 Celtic Cup, scoring seven tries in six games, and was named Ulster "A" player of the Year in the 2019 Ulster Rugby Awards. He joined the Ulster academy ahead of the 2019–20 season, committing himself full-time to rugby. He made his senior debut as a replacement against Edinburgh in November 2020. In January 2021 he signed a development contract, to be upgraded to a senior contract after one season. He was selected for the Ireland national rugby sevens team for the World Rugby Sevens Repechage in Monaco in July 2021, helping the team qualify for the Tokyo Olympics. He made two senior appearances for Ulster in the 2021–22 season, scoring a try against Cardiff in March 2022.

References

External links
Ulster Rugby profile
United Rugby Championship profile

2000 births
Living people
Irish rugby union players
Ulster Rugby players
Rugby union wings
Rugby union fullbacks
Ireland international rugby sevens players
Male sprinters from Northern Ireland
Irish male sprinters